Abu Khanadeq  is a Syrian village located in Sabburah Subdistrict in Salamiyah District, Hama.  According to the Syria Central Bureau of Statistics (CBS), Abu Khanadeq had a population of 507 in the 2004 census.

Syrian Civil War 
On February 5, 2018 the Syrian Armed Forces reported the capture Abu Khanadiq along with Buyud al-Saffaf, Abu al-Kheir, Rasm al-Kibar, Tell al-Shur, Malihah Saghirah, Rasm al-Mafkar, and Khirbat Umm Rujum from ISIL in northeastern Hama.

References 

Populated places in Salamiyah District